Brussels by Night is a Belgian drama film from 1983, directed by former Humo journalist Marc Didden. The low budget picture was financed partly by Herman Schueremans, organizer of the Flemish rock festival Rock Werchter. The film was named after a 1979 song by Raymond van het Groenewoud, who also wrote the soundtrack for the movie.

Brussels by Night was important in Belgian film history because its bleak, grey atmosphere and stream of consciousness structure were a sharp contrast with the more conventional films the country produced up to then.

Plot 

Brussels 1983. Max is seriously depressed. He tries to commit suicide by sticking a gun in his mouth, but when the gun jams, he cries nevertheless. We follow him as he travels through Brussels without any goal and provokes everyone he meets. His mood changes at the most unpredictable moments. Max meets two people, Alice, a bar keeper, and Abdel, her customer of Moroccan descent. Both men fancy Alice as their mistress. The climax of the story takes place on the Ronquières inclined plane.

Cast 
 François Beukelaers: Max
 Johan Joos: Station assistant
 Mariette Mathieu: Lady in train
 Daniël Van Avermaet: Taxi chauffeur
 Michiel Mentens: Louis
 Nellie Rosiers: Josephine-Charlotte
 Marleen Merckx: Waitress
 Ingrid De Vos: Alice
 Amid Chakir: Abdel
 Bernard Van Eeghem: Night club bouncer
 Jan Reussens: Receptionist
 Fred Van Kuyk: Jules
 Machteld Ramoudt: Sister Alice
 Liliane De Waegeneer: Ecologist at party
 Paul Pauwels: Blonde boy at party
 Jim Van Leemput: Parking meter man
 Josse De Pauw: Man in laundrette
 Jaak Pijpen: Guide in Ronquières
 Ronny Waterschoot: Police officer
 Guy Mortier: Assistant-judge
 Senne Rouffaer: Judge
 Brendan Fonteyne: Son of Max
 Fransceska Buelens: Wife of Max

Awards 
 1980: Staatsprijs for Best Script
 1983: Best Debut Filmfestival of San Sebastian
 1983: Silver trophy Spanish Federation of Ciné-Clubs at the Filmfestival of San Sebastian
 1983: André Cavens Prijs: Best Belgian film (Belgische Unie van de Filmkritiek)
 1984: 'Outstanding Film of the Year' Filmfestival of Londen

References

External links 
 
 MovieMeter: Brussels by Night (1983)
 De Standaard, 10 januari 2004: Brussels by Night

1983 films
Belgian drama films
Films set in Belgium
Films shot in Belgium
Films set in Brussels
Belgian independent films
1980s Dutch-language films
1980s French-language films
Films directed by Marc Didden
1983 drama films
1983 independent films
1983 multilingual films
Belgian multilingual films
French-language Belgian films